Place d'Armes may refer to
 Place d'Armes (Luxembourg), a square in Luxembourg City, Luxembourg
 Place-d'Armes, Paris, France
 Place d'Armes, in Montreal, Canada, an urban square
Place-d'Armes (Montreal Metro), a transit station 
Le 500 Place D'Armes, a building in Montreal
 Place d'Armes (Quebec City), the central square of the old city
 Place d'Armes, the French name of Jackson Square in New Orleans, Louisiana, U.S.A.
 Place d'Armes, the French name of Plaza de Armas in Old San Juan, Puerto Rico
 Place d'Armes, a novel by Scott Symons
Place-of-arms, an assembly area for troops within a fortification

See also
 Plaza de Armas, the Spanish equivalent